Villa Dolores is a city in the province of Córdoba, Argentina, located in the southwestern side of the province. It has a population of 29,854 inhabitants.

Although it is one of the smallest cities in Córdoba, many other provinces rely on Villa Dolores for its major export in potatoes. Wine consumption is also a large trait in this town having its own import route from the capital city of wine in Argentina, Mendoza.

Climate

Tourism 
Tourism in Villa Dolores peaks during the high season (January - February). Villa Dolores is known for its peaceful environment and views of the Cordoba mountain range. It is also known for its hidden rivers that run freshwater streams from the mountain tops, including the stream known as "La Piedra Pintada".

References

External links

 Municipal website

Populated places in Córdoba Province, Argentina
Tourism in Argentina
Cities in Argentina